from Electronic Arts is a Super Famicom football management video game that allows players to become the head coach of an international football team; it was named after the Brazilian midfielder Zico, who at the time was playing for Japanese team Kashima Antlers. The game is mostly in the Japanese language although some words are in the English language.

Gameplay
There is an exhibition mode, training mode, and two different kinds of cup (tournament) modes.

The game starts with a coin toss and the winner chooses to have possession of the football or to choose what side of the field to defend. No club play is possible with national leagues; there are only international teams (except for Kashima Antlers). However, England is excluded along with most other FIFA member nations. Instead of directly controlling the players, the manager/player must choose who must pass the ball to which player, where to shoot the football, where to move the players on the board, and how they should shoot the football.

See also
 Isto é Zico: Jiko no Kangaeru Soccer (Sega Saturn Interactive movie endorsed by Zico)

References

External links
Zico at Giant Bomb
Promotional flyer

1994 video games
Electronic Arts games
Association football management video games
Japan-exclusive video games
Kashima Antlers
Super Nintendo Entertainment System games
Super Nintendo Entertainment System-only games
Victor Entertainment games
Video games developed in Japan
Cultural depictions of Brazilian men
Cultural depictions of association football players
Video games based on real people